Samuel Bradford Davol is a musician best known for his work with the indie pop band The Magnetic Fields. He is featured several times in videos for The Magnetic Fields, and in the opening for "Born on a Train", his cello is featured at the beginning of the video. He also appears in Strange Powers, a 2009 documentary about Stephin Merritt.

He graduated from Concord Academy in 1988. He graduated magna cum laude from Harvard University and has a J.D. degree from New York University School of Law. He and his family now live in Lower Manhattan.

Along with his wife, Leslie, Davol is a founder and executive director of Street Lab, a non-profit organization which creates programs for public space. Notable among these is the Uni Project, founded by Sam and Leslie Davol, which brings mobile libraries and other educational programs to public urban spaces.

References

External links
 Boston Street Lab official site

Living people
Harvard University alumni
New York University School of Law alumni
American rock cellists
The Magnetic Fields members
Place of birth missing (living people)
Concord Academy alumni
Year of birth missing (living people)